The Tung Chung line is one of the ten lines of the MTR system in Hong Kong, linking the town of Tung Chung with central Hong Kong. A part of the Tung Chung line was built along with the Kap Shui Mun Bridge and the Tsing Ma Bridge. The line currently travels through eight stations in 31 minutes along its route. The line is coloured orange on the map.

History 
In October 1989, the Hong Kong government announced plans to build a new airport on the remote island of Chek Lap Kok to replace the overcrowded Kai Tak International Airport at the heart of Kowloon.

As part of the initiative, the government invited the MTR Corporation to build a rail link to the new airport dubbed the Lantau Airport Railway. The project initially saw opposition from the Chinese government as it feared the construction would drain the monetary reserve of the Hong Kong government and leave the Chinese with nothing after the British handed the territory over in 1997.

Both the Chinese and British governments reached an agreement and construction commenced in November 1994.

The Lantau Airport rail link consists of two train lines, the Tung Chung line and the Airport Express. Both lines deploy the same rolling stock with minor differences in interior fittings and liveries.

On 21 June 1998, the Tung Chung line was officially opened by Chief Executive Tung Chee-hwa, and service commenced the next day.

On 16 December 2003, an open house for charity took place at the recently completed Nam Cheong station, an interchange between the Tung Chung line and soon to be opened West Rail line. The station then closed on 19 December 2003 in preparation for the opening of the new West Rail line, and it was officially opened to public on 20 December 2003. Since then, the number of cars per train has increased from seven to eight to accommodate the additional patronage.

Sunny Bay station opened on 1 June 2005 as an interchange for the Disneyland Resort line. The resort opened its door two months after the station became operational.

Between 2006 and 2007, four new trains entered service to improve service frequency. The first train was delivered on 9 February 2006 and entered service on 12 June 2006. Modifications were added to the platforms to accommodate the new trains, which are a few millimetres wider than the original rolling stock.

Route map

Route description 
Unlike most other railway lines in the system, the Tung Chung line travels mostly above ground and spans a greater distance. The line shares its trackage with the Airport Express before diverging in Tung Chung.

The line travels underground from Hong Kong station to Kowloon station across the harbour, then surfaces to the ground to reach Olympic station. Trains continue to travel above ground along the West Kowloon Expressway and stops at Nam Cheong station, followed by Lai King station on a viaduct. Thereafter the line crosses the Rambler Channel and stops at Tsing Yi station on Tsing Yi Island.

Trains then enter a tunnel through the hills of the island and continues on the Tsing Ma Bridge and the Kap Shui Mun Bridge onto Lantau Island. The line continues along the North Lantau Expressway and stops at Sunny Bay before terminating at Tung Chung. The distance between the two stops is roughly 10 km and takes approximately 6 minutes to complete.

Some outbound trains do not continue to Lantau but terminate at Tsing Yi station due to the capacity constraint of the Tsing Ma Bridge which only allows a maximum of one train per track at all times.

Stations
This is a list of the stations on the Tung Chung line.

List

Design limitations
When British Hong Kong was planning to build the Airport Railway (Tung Chung line and Airport Express) in the 1990s, which was a few years before the handover to China, the Chinese government raised concerns about the effect of the project on the territory's fiscal reserves, which eventually forced the Hong Kong government to reduce the cost of the Airport Railway. The resulting changes made to the design imposed limitations on the level of service on the line.

 The airport rail link was originally designed to accommodate four tracks, two each for the Airport Express and Tung Chung line. It was later reduced to two tracks where both services share the same trackage. As a result, signal failures can affect both services.
 The Lantau Link section of the line (consisting of the Tsing Ma Bridge, Ma Wan Viaduct, and Kap Shui Mun Bridge) only allows one train to pass through each direction at the same time, raising the minimum headway between trains to 2 minutes 15 seconds. As a result, some Tung Chung line trains terminate at Tsing Yi during peak hours, instead of travelling the entire line.
 The signalling system is not capable of giving priority to Airport Express trains; as a result, Tung Chung line trains stopping at Sunny Bay station frequently impede Airport Express trains, which do not serve the station. Tung Chung Line trains would sometimes stop at Sunny Bay Station for an extended period of time to give way to the Airport Express trains.
 The power supply system restricts the number of trains running between Kowloon and Lai King stations. The system can accommodate a maximum of one Airport Express train and two Tung Chung trains travelling in both directions at one time. The minimum headway on this section of the line is 3 minutes 30 seconds.

Future development

Extensions on Hong Kong Island

Track extension near Hong Kong station 
An underground tunnel, around half a km long, will be built eastwards of Hong Kong station to allow Tung Chung Line and Airport Express trains to turn around, allowing the trains to easily switch directions, thus enhancing the efficiency of operations.

North Island line 

Once the North Island line is complete, trains will travel in a tunnel east of Hong Kong station along the shore of the island before merging into the Tseung Kwan O line at North Point. Three new stations - Tamar, Exhibition Centre and Causeway Bay North will form part of the extension.

Extension in Tung Chung
In the Railway Development Strategy 2014, it was proposed that the Tung Chung Line be extended west and a new station at Tung Chung West.

In April 2020, Carrie Lam and the Executive Council approved the detailed planning and design of the Tung Chung line extension project. It is scheduled to begin construction in 2023, while the cost of the two new stations, Tung Chung East and Tung Chung West, are expected to cost HK$18.7 billion. This extension is expected to be complete by 2029. The project is expected to extend the line an additional 1.5 kilometers. The design contract for the extension was recently awarded to British engineering companies Arup and Atkins.

See also 

 List of places in Hong Kong
 Transport in Hong Kong

References 

 
MTR lines
Railway lines opened in 1998
Regional rail in Hong Kong
1432 mm gauge railways in Hong Kong